Kearse Theater was a historic theatre building located at Charleston, West Virginia. It was constructed in 1921 and composed of a single floor auditorium with balcony behind a three-story front section which included two storefronts. It  was designed for stage shows as well as for movies. The theater was demolished in 1982.

It was listed on the National Register of Historic Places in 1980.

References

Buildings and structures in Charleston, West Virginia
Buildings and structures demolished in 1982
Demolished buildings and structures in West Virginia
National Register of Historic Places in Charleston, West Virginia
Theatres completed in 1921
Theatres on the National Register of Historic Places in West Virginia